Highway 305 is a highway in the Canadian province of Saskatchewan. It runs from Highway 16 near Langham to Highway 11 near Warman.

Highway 305 begins at Highway 16 at the southeastern corner of the Langham town limits. It travels east towards Dalmeny, where it turns south until it intersects Highway 684 and Highway 784. Highway 305 bypasses Warman, following the northern city boundary, and ends at Highway 11. In 2019 an interchange with Highway 11 was opened, modifying traffic patterns around other existing intersections.

History
Highway 305 was the original alignment of Highway 16, which at the time was designated as Provincial Highway 5.  At the time, the highway continued east from Warman, crossed the South Saskatchewan River via a ferry, and continued east to Aberdeen and Humboldt. By the mid-1950s, Highway 5 was rerouted to follow Highway 12 south and pass through Saskatoon, bypassing the Warman ferry. In the 1960s, Highway 5 was realigned between Langham and Saskatoon, and the bypassed section was re-designated as Highway 305. Until 2014, Highway 305 followed Central Street (Highway 784) through Warman and ended at Highway 11, until a new bypass was opened in 2014.

Major intersections
From west to east:

References

305